The Vietnam Institute of Archaeology is an important archaeological institution in Vietnam. It is based in Hanoi. The institute has been responsible for the coordination of many notable archaeological finds in the country.

External links 
 Institute of Archaeology 

Research institutes in Vietnam
Buildings and structures in Hanoi
Archaeological organizations